The 2012 Guam Republican presidential caucuses were held on March 10, 2012. Citizens of Guam send nine delegates to the convention. Former Massachusetts Governor Mitt Romney won the territory almost unanimously, with 207 of the 215 registered Republicans at the convention supporting him. Mitt Romney's son, Matt, campaigned in Saipan to represent his father at the convention.

The events occurred on the same day as the 2012 Kansas and United States Virgin Islands Republican caucuses.

Results

See also 
 2012 United States presidential straw poll in Guam
 2012 United States presidential election
 2012 Guam Democratic presidential caucuses

Notes

External links
The Green Papers: Major state elections in chronological order

Guam
2012 Guam elections
2012